S.M. Street, abbreviation for Sweetmeat Street, also known as Mittai Theruvu, is a shopping street located in Kozhikode, Kerala, India. The street is a pedestrian zone. It also has a 160 year old Fire temple amidst shopping places.

History
The history of SM Street dates back to time of the Zamorin when the ruler invited Gujarati sweetmeat makers to set up shop in the city and accommodated their shops just outside the palace walls.

About the Name
SM Street derives its name from the time it was lined with sweetmeat and halvah stalls. It is reputedly the busiest street in Kozhikode. Its Malayalam name is Mittai Theruvu.

Shops
From sweets to spices, clothes to electronics, or hand looms to textiles the shops at SM street offers everything which caters to your needs. Local handicrafts namely carvings made out of rosewood and buffalo horns, coir products such as floor mats, doormats, brushes, mattresses, and the snake boat toys, are the most popular ones.

Famous Business Establishments

1)Lohi Sports

2)Radha Theatre - a cinema hall.

3)Hotel Arya Bhavan

4)Sankaran Bakery - century old Halwa shop.

5)Maharaja Bakery

6)Peethambar Studio

7)Pacific Stores

8)Hotel Topform

9)Kalanthans Cool Bar - iconic juice shop

10)Jayasree Stores

11)Hotel Vasntha Bhavan

12)Wheat House

13)Teekay

14)NB Vittal Rao

15)Max Footwear

16)Apex Footwear

17)Schoolbazar

18) MasterCraft87

19) WITCO

Renovation of SM Street
In May 2017, As part of Phase 1 S.M. Street beautification project an amount of 3.64 crore was allocated. As part of renovation overhead power supply lines was removed and lamp posts was placed across the sides of street. Chief Minister Pinarayi Vijayan formally opened the renovated S.M. Street in Kozhikode on Saturday, 23 December 2017.

In popular culture
S. M. Street is the subject of the Kerala Sahitya Akademi Award-winning book Oru Theruvinte Katha by S. K. Pottekkatt.The statue of S.K. Pottekkatt, stands facing the street.

References

Shopping districts and streets in India
Roads in Kozhikode